Sunyani Senior High School (SUSEC) is a coeducational second cycle institution in Sunyani in the Bono Region of Ghana.

History
Sunyani Senior High was established in 1958 by Ghana's first President Dr. Kwame Nkrumah.

Notable alumni 
 Ignatius Baffour-Awuah — Member of Parliament for Sunyani West Constituency and Minister for Employment
 Ernest Akobuor Debrah — Former Member of Parliament for Tano North Constituency

Education

References

External links
 Website

Schools in Ghana
High schools in Ghana
Educational institutions established in 1958
Sunyani
1958 establishments in Ghana
Bono Region